Micraulax is a genus of air-breathing land snails, terrestrial pulmonate gastropod mollusks in the family Cyclophoridae. These snails are restricted to Western Ghats of India and Sri Lanka.

Two species are recognized.

Species
 Micraulax coeloconus (W.H. Benson, 1851)
 Micraulax scabra W. Theobald

References

External links
Wikimedia images